Robert Andrews (March 5, 1857 – September 19, 1928) was an American architect. His work was part of the architecture event in the art competition at the 1932 Summer Olympics.

References

1857 births
1928 deaths
20th-century American architects
Olympic competitors in art competitions
People from Hartford, Connecticut